Leti may refer to:

 Leti, Chakwal, a village and Union Council in Pakistan
 Leti Islands, Maluku, Indonesia
 Leti (island), one of the Leti islands in Maluku, Indonesia
 Leti language, a language in Indonesia
 Leti language (Cameroon), a language in Cameroon
 Leti leti, an Indonesian boat
 CEA-Leti: Laboratoire d'électronique des technologies de l'information, a French-based research institute
 LETI, a nickname and an old title of Saint Petersburg Electrotechnical University

People with the surname
 Emilio Leti (born 1963), Samoan boxer
 Gregorio Leti (1630–1701), Italian historian
 Nicolò Leti (1605–?), Bishop of Acquapendente

See also 
 Lete (disambiguation)
 Liti (disambiguation)
 Lity (disambiguation)
 Lite (disambiguation)